CAMEX is an age-group aquatics championships featuring teams from Central America and Mexico. It is held biennially in even years and is organized by CCCAN. 

The most recent edition of the event was held in Panama City between June 7–12, 2016.

Members

Locations

CAMEX swimming records
All records were set in finals unless noted otherwise. All times are swum in a long-course (50m) pool.

Boys (11-12)

Girls (11-12)

Mixed relay

Boys (13-14)

Girls (13-14)

Mixed relay

Boys (15-17)

Girls (15-17)

Mixed relay

Boys (18 & Over)

Girls (18 & Over)

Mixed relay

References
General
CAMEX records Updated 16.06.2016
Specific

External links
Historia CAMEX (CAMEX 2008 website)

Swimming competitions in North America
International swimming competitions